Agricultural zoning is a land management tool that refers to local zoning designations made by local jurisdictions that are intended to protect farmland and farming activities from incompatible land uses. Agricultural zoning can specify many factors, such as the uses allowed, minimum lot size, the number of nonfarm dwellings allowed, or the size of a buffer separating farm and nonfarm properties. Some jurisdictions further subdivide agricultural zones to distinguish industrial farming from uses like rural residence farms and retirement farms on large lots.

One example of such zoning is the Agricultural Reserve in Montgomery County, Maryland. The reserve was established in 1980 to preserve farmland and rural space.

See also
Farmland protection
Zoning in the United States

References 

Agricultural policy
Zoning
Agriculture in the United States